Moyie Lake Provincial Park is a provincial park in British Columbia, Canada. It is located on Moyie Lake, part of the Moyie River.

External links

Provincial parks of British Columbia
Parks in the Regional District of East Kootenay
East Kootenay
1959 establishments in British Columbia
Protected areas established in 1959